John Gottlieb Auer (November 18, 1832-February 16, 1874) was the second bishop of the Episcopal Diocese of Liberia.

Born in Württemberg, Germany, Auer was a Lutheran minister, but applied for and took orders in the Episcopal church, being ordained at Cavalla, Africa, in 1862. At a special meeting of the general convention, in October, 1872, Dr. Auer was elected missionary bishop of Cape Palmas, in Africa. He was consecrated 17 April, 1873. but was stricken down with fever, and his term of service was less than one year.

References

1832 births
1874 deaths
Bishops of the Episcopal Church (United States)
19th-century American Episcopalians
Anglican bishops of Liberia
19th-century American clergy